Paralimni is a village in Serres regional unit of Central Macedonia, Greece, located 21 km southeast of Serres.  Since 2011 administrative reform it has been a municipal unit of the municipality of Emmanouil Pappas and has a population of 720 inhabitants. Until 1928 it was named "Vernar".

History
About 500 m. north of Paralimni, near the bay of the dried-out ancient Cercinitis lake (later Achinos lake), the traces of a lakeside ancient settlement has been discovered, possibly named "Cima", which probably means "bay".
A number of ancient vase shells and an inscription of the Hellenistic period were found in this place.

References

Populated places in Serres (regional unit)
Archaeological sites in Macedonia (Greece)